A tumulus (plural tumuli) is a mound of earth and stones raised over a grave or graves. Tumuli are also known as barrows, burial mounds or kurgans, and may be found throughout much of the world. A cairn, which is a mound of stones built for various purposes, may also originally have been a tumulus.

Tumuli are often categorised according to their external apparent shape. In this respect, a long barrow is a long tumulus, usually constructed on top of several burials, such as passage graves. A round barrow is a round tumulus, also commonly constructed on top of burials. The internal structure and architecture of both long and round barrows has a broad range; the categorization only refers to the external apparent shape.

The method of  may involve a dolmen, a cist, a mortuary enclosure, a mortuary house, or a chamber tomb. Examples of barrows include Duggleby Howe and Maeshowe.

Etymology
The word tumulus is Latin for 'mound' or 'small hill', which is derived from the Proto-Indo-European root *teuh2- with extended zero grade *tum-, 'to bulge, swell' also found in tomb, tumor, tumescent, thumb, thigh, and thousand.

Burial accounts
The funeral of Patroclus is described in book 23 of Homer's Iliad. Patroclus is burned on a pyre, and his bones are collected into a golden urn in two layers of fat. The barrow is built on the location of the pyre. Achilles then sponsors funeral games, consisting of a chariot race, boxing, wrestling, running, a duel between two champions to the first blood, discus throwing, archery and spear throwing.

Beowulf's body in the Anglo-Saxon poem Beowulf is taken to Hronesness, where it is burned on a funeral pyre. During cremation, the Geats lament the death of their lord, a widow's lament being mentioned in particular, singing dirges as they circumambulate the barrow.
Afterwards, a mound is built on top of a hill, overlooking the sea, and filled with treasure. A band of twelve of the best warriors ride around the barrow, singing dirges in praise of their lord.

Parallels have also been drawn to the account of Attila's burial in Jordanes' Getica. Jordanes tells that as Attila's body was lying in state, the best horsemen of the Huns circled it, as in circus games.

An Old Irish Life of Columcille reports that every funeral procession "halted at a mound called Eala, whereupon the corpse was laid, and the mourners marched thrice solemnly round the spot."

Types
Archaeologists often classify tumuli according to their location, form, and date of construction (see also mound). Some British types are listed below:

 Bank barrow
 Bell barrow
 Bowl barrow
 D-shaped barrow – round barrow with a purposely flat edge at one side often defined by stone slabs.
 Disc barrow
 Fancy barrow – generic term for any Bronze Age barrows more elaborate than a simple hemispherical shape.
 Long barrow
 Oval barrow – a Neolithic long barrow consisting of an elliptical, rather than rectangular or trapezoidal mound.
 Platform barrow – The least common of the recognised types of round barrow, consisting of a flat, wide circular mound that may be surrounded by a ditch. They occur widely across southern England with a marked concentration in East and West Sussex.
 Pond barrow – a barrow consisting of a shallow circular depression, surrounded by a bank running around the rim of the depression, from the Bronze Age.
 Ring barrow – a bank that encircles a number of burials.
 Round barrow – a circular feature created by the Bronze Age peoples of Britain and also the later Romans, Vikings, and Saxons. Divided into subclasses such as saucer and bell barrow – the Six Hills are a rare Roman example.
 Saucer barrow – a circular Bronze Age barrow that features a low, wide mound surrounded by a ditch that may have an external bank.
 Square barrow – burial site, usually of Iron Age date, consisting of a small, square, ditched enclosure surrounding a central burial, which may also have been covered by a mound.

Modern practices 

There is a contemporary revival in barrow building in the UK. In 2015 the first long barrow in thousands of years, the Long Barrow at All Cannings, inspired by those built in the Neolithic era, was built on land just outside the village of All Cannings. The barrow was designed to have a large number of private niches within the stone and earth structure to receive cremation urns.

This was followed by new barrows at:
 The Willow Row Barrow at St Neots.
 The Soulton Long Barrow at Soulton in Shropshire.
 Higher Ground Meadow in Dorset
 Warwickshire.

Plans have also been announced for a barrow in Milton Keynes and in Powis.

Sites

Africa

Horn of Africa
Salweyn in Somaliland contains a very large field of cairns, which stretches for a distance of around 8 km. An excavation of one of these tumuli by Georges Révoil in 1881 uncovered a tomb, beside which were artefacts pointing to an ancient, advanced civilization. The interred objects included pottery shards from Samos, some well-crafted enamels, and a mask of Ancient Greek design.

West Africa

Preceded by assumed earlier sites in the Eastern Sahara, tumuli with megalithic monuments developed as early as 4700 BC in the Saharan region of Niger. These megalithic monuments in the Saharan region of Niger and the Eastern Sahara may have served as antecedents for the mastabas and pyramids of ancient Egypt.

In Niger, there are two monumental tumuli – a cairn burial (5695 BP – 5101 BP) at Adrar Bous, and a tumulus covered with gravel (6229 BP – 4933 BP) at Iwelen, in the Aïr Mountains.  Tenerians did not construct the two monumental tumuli at Adrar Bous and Iwelen. Rather, Tenerians constructed cattle tumuli at a time before the two monumental tumuli were constructed.

The Tichitt Tradition of eastern Mauritania dates from 2200 BC to 200 BC. Within the settled areas of Tichitt Culture (e.g., Dhar Tichitt, Dhar Tagant, Dhar Walata), with stone walls, which vary in scale from (e.g., 2 hectares, 80 hectares), there were walled agricultural land utilized for livestock or gardening as well as land with granaries and tumuli. Based on the hundreds of tumuli present in Dhar Tichitt, compared to a dozen tumuli present in Dhar Walata, it is likely that Dhar Tichitt was the primary center of religion for the people of Tichitt culture.  

At Wanar, Senegal, megalithic monolith-circles and tumuli (1300/1100 BC – 1400/1500 AD) were constructed by West Africans who had a complex hierarchical society. In the mid-region of the Senegal River Valley, the Serer people may have created tumuli (before 13th century AD), shell middens (7th century AD – 13th century AD) in the central-west region, and shell middens (200 BC – Present) in the southern region. The funerary tumuli-building tradition of West Africa was widespread and a regular practice amid 1st millennium AD. More than ten thousand large funerary tumuli exist in Senegal.

At the Inner Niger Delta, in the Mali Lakes Region, there are two monumental tumuli constructed in the time period of the Trans-Saharan trade for the Sahelian kingdoms of West Africa. The El Oualadji monumental tumulus, which dates between 1030 AD and 1220 AD and has two human remains buried with horse remains and various items (e.g., horse harnesses, horse trappings with plaques and bells, bracelets, rings, beads, iron items), may have been, as highlighted by al-Bakri, the royal burial site of a king from the Ghana Empire. The Koï Gourrey monumental tumulus, which may date prior to 1326 AD and has over twenty human remains that were buried with various items (e.g., iron accessories, an abundant amount of copper bracelets, anklets and beads, an abundant amount of broken, but whole pottery, another set of distinct, intact, glazed pottery, a wooden-beaded bone necklace, a bird figurine, a lizard figurine, a crocodile figurine), and is situated within the Mali Empire.

Asia

Central Asia

The word kurgan is of Turkic origin, derives from Proto-Turkic *Kur- ("to erect (a building), to establish"). In Ukraine and Russia, there are royal kurgans of Varangian chieftains, such as the Black Grave in Ukrainian Chernihiv (excavated in the 19th century), Oleg's Grave in Russian Staraya Ladoga, and vast, intricate Rurik's Hill near Russian Novgorod. Other important kurgans are found in Ukraine and South Russia and are associated with much more ancient steppe peoples, notably the Scythians (e.g., Chortomlyk, Pazyryk) and early Indo-Europeans (e.g., Ipatovo kurgan) The steppe cultures found in Ukraine and South Russia naturally continue into Central Asia, in particular Kazakhstan.

It is constructed over a grave, often characterized by containing a single human body along with grave vessels, weapons and horses. Originally in use on the Pontic–Caspian steppe, kurgans spread into much of Central Asia and Eastern, Southeast, Western and Northern Europe during the 3rd millennium BC.

The earliest kurgans date to the 4th millennium BC in the Caucasus, and researchers associate these with the Indo-Europeans. Kurgans were built in the Eneolithic, Bronze, Iron, Antiquity and Middle Ages, with ancient traditions still active in Southern Siberia and Central Asia.

Near East

Turkey

On the Anatolian peninsula, there are several sites where one can find the biggest specimens of these artificial mounds throughout the world. Three of these sites are especially important. Bin Tepe (and other Lydian mounds of the Aegean inland), Phrygian mounds in Gordium (Central Anatolia), and the famous Commagene tumulus on the Mount Nemrut (Southeastern Anatolia).

This is the most important of the enumerated sites with the number of specimens it has and with the dimensions of certain among them. It is in the Aegean inland of Turkey. The site is called "Bin Tepeler" (a thousand mounds in Turkish) and it is in the northwest of Salihli district of Manisa province. The site is very close to the southern shoreline of Lake Marmara (Lake Gyges or Gygaea). Bin Tepeler is a Lydian necropolis that dates back to 7th and 6th centuries BC. These mounds are called "the pyramids of Anatolia", as a giant specimen among them is 355 metres in diameter, 1115 metres in perimeter and 69 metres high. According to Herodotus, this giant tumulus belongs to the famous Lydian King Alyattes who ruled between 619 and 560 BC. There is also another mound belonging to King Gyges. The Gyges mound was excavated but the burial chamber hasn't been found yet. In this site, there are 75 tumuli dating back to Lydian period that belong to the nobility. A large number of smaller artificial mounds can also be observed in the site. There are other Lydian tumuli sites around Eşme district of Uşak province. Certain mounds in these sites had been plundered by raiders in the late 1960s, and the Lydian treasures found in their burial chambers were smuggled to the United States, which later returned them to Turkish authorities after negotiations. These artifacts are now exhibited in the Archaeological Museum of Uşak.

Gordium (Gordion) was the capital of the ancient kingdom of Phrygia. Its ruins are in the immediate vicinity of Polatlı, near the Turkish capital Ankara. At this site, approximately 80–90 tumuli date back to the Phrygian, Persian and Hellenistic periods. Around 35 tumuli have been excavated so far, ranging in date from the 8th century BC to the 3rd or 2nd century BC. The biggest tumulus at the site is believed to have covered the burial of the famous Phrygian King Midas or that of his father. This mound, called Tumulus MM (for "Midas Mound"), was excavated in 1957 by a team from the University of Pennsylvania Museum, led by Rodney Young and his graduate students. Among the many fine bronze artifacts recovered from the wooden burial chamber were 170 bronze vessels, including numerous "omphalos bowls", and more than 180 bronze "Phrygian fibulae" (ancient safety pins). The wooden furniture found in the tomb is especially noteworthy, as wood seldom survives from archaeological contexts: the collection included nine tables, one of them elaborately carved and inlaid, and two ceremonial serving stands inlaid with religious symbols and geometric patterns. Important bronze and wooden artifacts were also found in other tumulus burials at the site.

The Mount Nemrut is 86 km in the east of Adıyaman province of Turkey. It is very close to Kahta district of the same province. The mountain has, at its peak, 3050 metres of height above the sea level. A tumulus that dates to the 1st century BC is at the peak of the mountain. This artificial mound has 150 metres of diameter and a height of 50 metres, which was originally 55 metres. It belongs to the Commagene King Antiochus I Theos of Commagene who ruled between 69 and 40 BC. This tumulus is made of broken stone pieces, which renders excavation attempts almost impossible. The tumulus is surrounded by ceremonial terraces in the east, west, and north. The east and west terraces have tremendous statues (reaching 8 to 10 meters of height) and bas reliefs of gods and goddesses from the Commagene pantheon where divine figures used to embody the Persian and Roman perceptions together.

Israel

A tumulus forms the center of the ancient megalithic structure of Rujm el-Hiri in the Golan Heights. Rujm in Arabic can mean tumulus, cairn or stone heap. Near the western city limits of modern Jerusalem, 19 tumuli have been documented (Amiran, 1958). Though first noticed in the 1870s by early surveyors, the first one to be formally documented was Tumulus #2 in 1923 by William Foxwell Albright, and the most recent one (Tumulus #4) was excavated by Gabriel Barkay in 1983.  The association of these tumuli with the Judean kings who ruled Jerusalem does not substantiate Biblical history since it is mere speculation. No inscriptions naming any specific Judean king have been excavated from a tumulus.
 More than half of these ancient Israeli structures have now been threatened or obliterated by modern construction projects, including Tumulus #4, which was excavated hastily in a salvage operation. The most noteworthy finds from this dig were two LMLK seal impressions and two other handles with associated Concentric Circle incisions, all of which suggests this tumulus belonged to either King Hezekiah or his son Manasseh.
 When comparing the number of these tumuli to the total number of Israelite kings (northern and southern), note that Saul never ruled in Jerusalem, and Athaliah was never crowned. She took the throne by force (2Kings 11:1–3), and would certainly not have been honored with a tumulus ceremony following her brutal assassination.
 The northern kings did not reign over the southern kingdom, and they would certainly not have been honored with a tumulus ceremony in Jerusalem; if any ceremonies were held for them, they would have transpired in the north (near Bethel, Tirzah, or Samaria).

South Asia

India
The Ahom kingdom in medieval Assam built octagonal tumuli called Maidams for their kings and high officials. The kings were buried in a hillock at Charaideo in Sibsagar district of Assam, whereas other Maidams are found scattered more widely.

Pakistan
The damb was a type of mound, or small stone structure, found in Balochistan, including the coastal areas of Makran.

East Asia

China
The Chinese pyramids house the remains of some of China's former emperors.

Before the expansion of Shang and Zhou culture through the region, many hundreds of tumuli were also constructed by the "Baiyue" peoples of the Yangtze valley and southeastern China.

Japan

In Japan, powerful leaders built tumuli known as kofun. The Kofun period of Japanese history takes its name from these burial mounds. The largest is Daisen-ryo Kofun, or more commonly Nintoku-ryo Kofun, with a length of 840 metres. In addition to other shapes, kofun include a keyhole shape, typically seen in Daisen Kofun. Foreign museums possess some grave goods.

Korea

see also Cheonmachong, the Heavenly Horse Tomb

The first burial mounds in Korea were dolmens, which contained material from cultures of the 1st millennium AD, such as bronze-ware, pottery, and other symbols of society elite. The most famous tumuli in Korea, dating around 300 AD, are those left behind by the Korean Baekje, Goguryeo (Kogyuro/Koguryo), Silla, and Gaya states and are clustered around ancient capital cities in modern-day Pyongyang, Ji'an, Jilin, Seoul, and Gyeongju. The Goguryeo tombs, shaped like pyramids, are famous for the well-preserved wall murals like the ones at Anak Tomb No.3, which depict the culture and artistry of the people. The base of the tomb of King Gwanggaeto is 85 meters on each side, half of the size of the Great Pyramids. Goguryeo Silla tombs are most noted for the fabulous offerings that have been excavated such as delicate golden crowns and glassware and beads that probably made their way to Korea via the Silk Road. Many indigenous Korean artifacts and culture were transmitted to the tomb builders of early Japan, such as horsetrappings, bronze mirrors, paintings and iron-ware.

Europe

Southeast Europe

Albania
Tumuli are one of the most prominent types of prehistoric monuments spread throughout northern and southern Albania. Some well-known local tumuli are:
 Kamenica Tumulus
 Lofkënd Tumulus
 Pazhok Tumulus

Bosnia and Herzegovina
More than 50 burial mounds were found in Kupres. Man from Kupres – the skeleton found in one of the tumuli is believed to be more than 3000 years old and it is kept in Gorica museum in Livno. Glasinac has many tumuli. During the Bronze and Iron Age it was a place of strong Glasinac culture, who buried their dead in tumulus.

Bulgaria

On the territory of Bulgaria there are over 60,000 ancient Thracian mounds, of which only about 1,000 have been studied. There are also Roman and Thraco-Roman burial tombs. Those tumulus over ancient tombs, temples and sanctuaries are found throughout the whole territory of Bulgaria. Some of the world's most significant and famous being the Kazanlak and Sveshtari tombs, UNESCO World Heritage sites. Located near the ancient Thracian capital cities of Seuthopolis (of the Odrysian kingdom) and Daosdava or Helis (of the Getae), perhaps they represented royal burials. Other notable tumulus are Thracian tomb of Aleksandrovo, Thracian tomb Golyama Arsenalka, Thracian tomb Shushmanets, Thracian tomb Griffins, Thracian tomb Helvetia, Thracian tomb Ostrusha, Tomb of Seuthes III and the other tombs around Starosel, others contained offerings such as the Panagyurishte and Rogozen treasures. Some of the sites are located in the Valley of the Thracian Rulers. The mound of the Tomb of Seuthes III “Golyama Kosmatka” is among the largest mounds in Thrace, with a maximum height of 23 m. and a diameter of 130 m.

Croatia
There are thousands of tumuli throughout all Croatia, built of stone (Croatian: gomila, gromila) in the karst areas (by the Adriatic Sea) or made of earth (Croatian: humak) in the inland plains and hills.  Most of these prehistoric structures were built in the 2nd and 1st millennium BC, from the middle Bronze Age to the end of the Iron Age, by the Illyrians or their direct ancestors in the same place; the Liburnian inhumation of dead under tumuli was certainly inherited from the earlier times, as early as the Copper Age. Smaller tumuli were used as the burial mounds, while bigger (some up to 7 metres high with 60 metres long base) were the cenotaphs (empty tombs) and ritual places.

Greece

Some of the world's most prominent Tumuli, the Macedonian tombs and a cist-grave at Vergina include the tomb of Philip II (359–336 BC), father of Alexander the Great (336–323 BC), as well as the tomb of Alexander IV (323–309 BC), son of Alexander the Great. A very large tumulus has been discovered in Amphipolis. Known as the Kasta Tomb, the tomb's occupant is presently unknown. Also numerous Mycenaean Greek Tombs are in all essence Tumuli, notably Agamemnon's site in Mycenae, and other sites in Tiryns, near Olympia and Pylos, and mostly in the Peloponnese peninsula near Mycenaean sites and Bronze Age settlements. Moreover, in Central Greece there are numerous Tumuli, some excavated, others not. A notable one is in Marathon, serving as a burial for the ones who fell during battle.

As of October 2014 there are ongoing excavations at the Kasta Tomb in Amphipolis, Macedonia, Greece with the tumulus having a perimeter of 497 meters. The tomb within is assessed to be an ancient Macedonian burial monument of the last quarter of the 4th century BC.
 Macedonian Tombs, Korinos
 Macedonian Tombs, Katerini

Hungary
There are over 40,000 tumuli in the Great Hungarian Plain, the highest is Gödény-halom near the settlement of Békésszentandrás, in Békés county.

Sírhalom origins and forms are diverse: tells, graves, border barrows, watcher barrows.

Serbia

 Mrčajevci, several prehistoric tumuli
 Bukovac, Illyrian tumuli and necropolis
 Five prehistoric tumuli in the Morava valley.
 Gromile, Serbian tumuli in Ravna Gora.
 Kinđa

Western and Central Europe

Austria

 Burgstallkogel (Sulm valley)
 Großmugl (Lower Austria)
 Pillichsdorf (Lower Austria)
 Niederhollabrunn (Lower Austria)
 Gaisruck (in Niederösterreich)
 Langenlebarn (in Niederösterreich)
 Deutsch-Altenburg (in Niederösterreich)
 Bernhardsthal (Lower Austria)
 Siegendorf (Burgenland)
 Schandorf (Burgenland)
 Kleinklein (Styria)
 Niederfellabrunn (Lower Austria))
 Oberhofen am Irrsee (Upper Austria)
 Obermallebarn (Lower Austria)
 Unterzögersdorf (Lower Austria)

Belgium
 Two Tumuli of Ambresin (Liège Province)
 Tumulus of Avernas in Hannut (Liège): height: 8 m; circumference: 100 m
 Tumulus of the "champ de la Tombe" in Braives (Liège), 1st century AD Roman tomb.
 Tumulus of Court-Saint-Étienne (Walloon Brabant), around 3,000 BC.
 Tumulus of Glimes in Incourt (Walloon Brabant), Gallo-Roman period: height: 11 m; diameter: 50 m
 Tumulus of Hottomont in Ramillies (Walloon Brabant), tomb of : height: 11.5 m ; diameter: 50 m
 Tumulus of Oleye (Liek) (Liège)
 Tumulus of Pepin of Landen in Landen (Flemish Brabant)
 Tumuli of the Sonian Forest (Flemish Brabant), 1st millennium BC.
 Three Tumuli of Grimde in Tienen (Flemish Brabant), 1st century BC Gallo-Roman tombs.
 Tumulus of Trou de Billemont in Antoing (Hainaut Province), 6th and 7th-century Merovingian tombs.
 Tumulus of Walhain (Walloon Brabant)
 Two Tumuli of Waremme (Liège)
 Tumuli of Wéris (Belgian Luxembourg), 4th and 3rd millennium BC.

United Kingdom

In the United Kingdom, barrows of a wide range of types were in widespread use for burying the dead from the late Neolithic until the end of the Bronze Age, 2900–800 BC. Square barrows were occasionally used in the Iron Age (800 BC-43 AD) in the east of England. The traditional round barrow experienced a brief resurgence following the Anglo-Saxon conquests, with the introduction of northern Germanic burial practices from continental Europe. These later barrows were often built near older Bronze Age barrows. They included a few instances of ship burial. Barrow burial fell out of use during the 7th century as a result of the spread of Christianity.
Early scholarly investigation of tumuli and theorising as to their origins was undertaken from the 17th century by antiquaries, notably John Aubrey, and William Stukeley. During the 19th century in England the excavation of tumuli was a popular pastime amongst the educated and wealthy upper classes, who became known as "barrow-diggers". This leisure activity played a key role in laying the foundations for the scientific study of the past in Britain but also resulted in untold damage to the sites.

Notable British barrows include:
 West Kennet Long Barrow – Neolithic long barrow in Wiltshire
 Wayland's Smithy – Neolithic long barrow and chamber tomb in Oxfordshire (historically Berkshire)
 Belas Knap – Neolithic long barrow in Gloucestershire
 Maeshowe – Neolithic chambered cairn and passage grave on Mainland, Orkney
 Duggleby Howe – Neolithic round barrow in the East Riding of Yorkshire
 Sutton Hoo – 7th-century East Anglian ship burial with exceptionally rich grave goods in Suffolk
 Devil's Humps – Bronze Age barrow group on Bow Hill in West Sussex
 Devil's Jumps – Bronze Age barrow group on the South Downs of West Sussex
 Seamer Beacon – Bronze Age barrow near Scarborough, North Yorkshire

Czech Republic
During the early Middle Ages, Slavic tribesmen inhabiting what is now the Czech Republic used to bury their dead under barrows. This practice has been widespread in southern and eastern Bohemia and some neighbouring regions, like Upper Austria and Lusatia, which at that time have been also populated with Slavic people. There are no known Slavic barrows in the central part of the country (around Prague), nor are they found in Moravia. This has led some of the archaeologists to speculations about at least three distinct waves of Slavic settlers, who colonized Czech lands separately from each other, each wave bringing its customs with it (including burial rituals).

At places where barrows have been constructed, they are usually found in groups (10 to 100 together), often forming several clearly distinct lines going from the west to the east. Only a few of them have been studied scientifically so far; in them, both burials by fire (with burnt ashes) and unburned skeletons have been found, even on the same site. It seems that builders of the barrows have at some time switched from burials by fire to burying of unburned corpses; the reason for such change is unknown. The barrows date too far back in history (700 AD to 800 AD) to contain any Christian influences.

As Czech barrows usually served for burials of poor villagers, only a few objects are found in them except for cheap pottery. Only one Slavic barrow is known to have contained gold.

Most of the Czech burial barrows have been damaged or destroyed by intense agriculture in the densely populated region. Those that remain are usually in forests, especially at hilltops in remote places. Therefore, there is no general knowledge about burial barrows among Czech population.

The best Slavic barrow sites can be found near to Vitín, a small village close to České Budějovice. There are two groups of barrows close to Vitín, each containing about 80 barrows ordered in lines. Some of the barrows are as much as 2 metres high.

There are also some prehistoric burial barrows in Czech Republic, built by unknown people. Unlike Slavic barrows, they can be found all across the country, though they are scarce. Distinguishing them from Slavic ones is not an easy task for the unskilled eye. Perhaps the most famous of them forms the top of the Žuráň hill near Slavkov u Brna; it is from here that Napoleon commanded his forces during the Battle of Austerlitz.

France

This set is considered to be one of the oldest western European megalithic necropolis.
 A few kilometers from Carnac are the  neolithic  near the famous broken Menhir.
 The five  in the Benon forest form a neolithic necropolis in the Courçon commune (Charente-Maritime).
  is a neolithic monument located about 5 kilometres west of Saint-Nazaire (Loire-Atlantique).
 The tumulus of Lamalou dolmen is situated at the headwaters of the Lamalou river.
 Tumulus and burial chamber (dolmen) of Bergerie de Panissière is located near Alès (Gard).
 Tanouëdou tumulus is located near Bourbriac (Côtes d'Armor, Brittany).
 , on the Melrand commune (Morbihan), is listed as monument historique since 1972.
The results of the excavations are exposed in the Unterlinden Museum in Colmar.
 Tumulus des Hogues, neolithic monuments located in Habloville.

Germany
Hügelgrab ("barrow", "burial mound" or "tumulus") sites in Germany dating to the Early and Middle Bronze Age.

Barrows or tumuli sites in Germany dating to the Late Bronze and Iron Age.

Barrows or tumuli sites in Germany dating to the Stone Age.

Other Barrows/tumuli in Germany of unstated date.

Ireland
A tumulus can be found close to the Grianán of Aileach in County Donegal. It has been suggested by historians such as George Petrie, who surveyed the site in the early 19th century, that the tumulus may predate the ringfort of Aileach by many centuries possibly to the Neolithic age. Surrounding stones were laid horizontally, and converged towards the centre. The mound had been excavated in Petrie's time, but nothing explaining its meaning was discovered. It was subsequently destroyed, but its former position is marked by a heap of broken stones. Similar mounds can be found at The Hill of Tara and there are several prominent tumuli at Brú na Bóinne in County Meath.

Italy
Some large tumulus tombs can be found especially in the Etruscan culture, carved directly into the local limestone (tufa), and covered by a limestone dome and a layer of dirt and grass (see image to the right). From the outside, they resemble burial mounds. 

The interior of these tumuli, however, is what makes them so unique. Most tombs have one central corridor, where sarcophagi and urns house the cremated remains of the deceased were found, and the various rooms to either side of the corridor which contain the deceased's various belongings.

Many tombs also hold paintings, or frescos, that in many cases represent the funeral, scenes of real life, or the afterlife. The most significant necropolises with tumulus tombs are Veio, Cerveteri, Vetulonia, and Populonia. The tumulus of Montopoli is relative of archaic center Colli della Città along paratiberina way in Tiber valley.

Smaller barrows are dated to the Villanova period (ninth-eighth centuries BC), but the biggest were used in the following centuries (from the seventh century afterwards) by the Etruscan aristocracy.

Netherlands
 Burial mounds are the most numerous archaeological monuments in the Netherlands. In many places, these prehistoric graves are still clearly visible as low hills. The oldest tumuli (grafheuvels) in the Netherlands were built near Apeldoorn about 5,000 years ago. Concentrations of tumuli from the Bronze Age are located on the Veluwe and Drenthe.

Early scholarly investigation of tumuli and hunebedden and theorising as to their origins was undertaken from the 17th century by notably Johan Picardt. Although many have disappeared over the centuries, some 3000 tumuli are known of which 636 are protected as Rijksmonument. The largest tumulus in the Netherlands is the grave of a king near Oss. Rijksmuseum van Oudheden, Drents Museum, and Huis van Hilde have findings from tumuli in their collections.

Portugal

One of the densest manifestations of the megalithic phenomenon in Europe occurred in Portugal. In the north of the country there are more than 1000 late prehistoric barrows. They generally occur in clusters, forming a necropolis. The method of inhumation usually involves a dolmen. The tumuli, dated from c. 4450 to 1900 BC, are up to 3 metres high, with diameters from 6 to 30 metres. Most of them are mounds of earth and stones, but the more recent ones are composed largely or entirely of stones (cairns). In Portuguese, barrows are called , from the Latin , given to them by the Romans because of their shape, similar to the breast of a woman.

Scandinavia

Burial mounds were in use from the Stone Age until the 11th century in Scandinavia and figure heavily in Norse paganism. In their original state they usually appear as small, man-made hillocks, though many examples have been damaged by ploughing or plundering so that little visible evidence remains.

The tumuli of Scandinavia is of a great variety of designs, depending on the cultural traditions of the era in which they were constructed. The tumuli tombs may contain single graves, collective graves and both inhumation and cremation was practiced, again depending on the era, but also on geography. Many tumuli in Scandinavia shows a continuation of use from Stone Age to Viking Age. In the Viking Age (and perhaps in earlier times as well) burning the deceased, was believed to transfer the person to Valhalla by the consuming force of fire. Archaeological finds testifies that the cremation fire could reach temperatures of up to 1500 °C. The remains were often covered with cobblestones and then a layer of gravel and sand and finally a thin layer of turf or placed in urns. The tumuli were used for ancestral worshipping, an important practice in Norse culture and many places shows continuation of use for millennia.

Sweden

 Anundshög, located just outside the City of Västerås, is Sweden's largest burial mound.
 Gamla Uppsala, The Royal mounds (Swedish: Kungshögarna) is the name for the three large barrows which are located in Gamla Uppsala. According to ancient mythology and folklore, it would be the three gods Thor, Odin and Freyr lying in Kungshögarna or Uppsala högar.
 Gravhög Gårdstånga, situated in Eslöv Municipality, Skåne County, is the site of a Bronze Age burial mound, (Swedish: Gravhög).
 Hågahögen, King Björn's barrow in Håga (Old Norse word: haugr) near Uppsala has a very strong connection with Björn at Haugi.
 Kungshögar, an archaeological site on the Lake Mälaren island of Adelsö in Ekerö Municipality, contains five large burial mounds.
 Skalunda hög in Västergötland, the site of Skalunda Barrow, an historic burial mound.

Norway

 Raknehaugen, dated to c. 550 AD, is located in the traditional district of Romerike. At 77 m in diameter and a height of 15 m, it is the largest tumulus in Northern Europe.
 Jellhaugen outside Halden, Østfold, considered the 2nd biggest in Norway, and dated back to around 500 AD.
 Gokstadhaugen a burial mound in Sandefjord, Vestfold, revealed a ship burial containing the Gokstad ship, a Viking era ship dating to the 9th century. The ship is the largest in the Viking Ship Museum in Bygdøy, Oslo.
 Oseberghaugen, the Oseberg burial mound at Oseberg near Tønsberg in Vestfold county, contained the Oseberg ship, a well-preserved Viking era ship dating from around 800 AD.
 Borrehaugene (Borre mound cemetery) forms part of the Borre National Park in Horten, Vestfold.
 Båthaugen, a boat burial mound found at Rolvsøy in Tune, Østfold, contained the Tune ship, a Viking Age ship of the "karv" type. The ship was built around AD 900 and is made of clinkered oak planks.
 Storhaug (Great Mound) ship's burial mound Avaldsnes on Karmøy in Rogaland County, Norway contained a ship made of oak.
 Grønhaug (Green Mound), a ship burial at Avaldsnes, contained an approximately 15-metre (49 ft) long boat with remains of a man's grave from the 10th century.
 Flagghaugen (Flag Hill Mound) at Avaldsnes, one of Norway's richest grave dating from the pre-Viking Period, contained a neck ring of 600 grams (19 ozt) of pure gold, weapons, bandoleer mountings and various tubs of silver and bronze.
 Karnilshaugen, in Gloppen in the county of Sogn og Fjordane, is Karnil's tumulus.
 Osneshaugen, in Ulsteinvik in the county of Møre og Romsdal, is a tumulus overlooking the Osnes beach. It is believed to have been sacked, and has not been excavated in modern times. It has been dated to the Bronze Age.

Denmark

Denmark has about 20,000 preserved tumuli, with the oldest being around 5,000 years old. A great number of tumuli in Denmark has been destroyed in the course of history, ploughed down for agricultural fields or used for road or dyke constructions. Tumuli have been protected by law since 1937 and is officially supervised by the Danish Agency for Culture. Examples of tumuli in Denmark are:
 Yding Skovhøj in Horsens municipality, Jutland is one of Denmark's Bronze Age burial mounds built on the top of the hill.
 Hov Dås in Thisted municipality, North Jutland is one of Denmark's neolithic burial mounds built on the top of the hill.
 Klekkende Høj is a megalithic passage grave constructed in the Stone Age on the island of Møn. It takes its name from the nearby village of Klekkende.
 Lindholm Høje is a major Viking and Iron Age burial site and former settlement, situated to the north of and overlooking the city of Aalborg.
 Grønjægers Høj, meaning "the mound of Green Hunter", dates to the Nordic Bronze Age and is located near Fanefjord Church on the Danish island of Møn.
 Gorm and Thyra's Høje, two huge burial mounds at Jelling.

North America

Canada

Human settlement in L'Anse Amour dates back at least 7,500 years as evidenced by the burial mound of a Maritime Archaic boy. His body was wrapped in a shroud of bark or hide and placed face down with his head pointed to the west. The site was first excavated in the 1970s.

The Augustine Mound is an important Mi'kmaq burial site in New Brunswick.

Taber Hill is a Haudenosaunee burial mound in Toronto, Ontario.

In the southern regions of Manitoba and Saskatchewan, evidence of ancient mound builders was discovered by archaeologists, beginning with excavations by Henry Youle Hind in 1857.

In Southwestern British Columbia, several types of burial mounds are known from the Salishan region (Hill-Tout 1895).

United States

Mound building was a central feature of the public architecture of many Native American and Mesoamerican cultures from Chile to Minnesota. Thousands of mounds in the United States have been destroyed as a result of farming, pot-hunting, amateur and professional archaeology, road-building and construction. Surviving mounds are still found in river valleys, especially along the Mississippi, Tennessee and Ohio Rivers, and as far west as Spiro Mounds in Oklahoma.

Mounds were used for burial, to support residential and religious structures, to represent a shared cosmology, and to unite and demarcate community. Common forms include conical mounds, ridge-top mounds, platform mounds, and animal effigy mounds, but there are many variations. Mound building in the USA is believed to date back to at least 3400 BC in the Southeast (see Watson Brake). The Adena and the Mississippian cultures are principally known for their mounds, as is the Hopewell tradition. The largest mound site north of Mexico is Cahokia Mounds, a vast World Heritage Site located just east of St. Louis, Missouri.

South America

Uruguay

The Cerritos de Indios (Spanish for: Indian Mounds or Indian Little Hills) are a collection of more than 3000 tumulus or earth mounds found mainly in the eastern region of Uruguay.

Of different sizes and shapes some of them date back to 5000–4000 years ago being among the oldest examples of tumulus building in the new world. It is still unknown to this day the name or the fate of the people group responsible for its construction as they disappeared long before the arrival of the first European explorers and left no written records.

It is believed that they were used for burial, as well for living and practicing agriculture in the flat marshlands and plains of eastern Uruguay.

See also
 Barrow-downs in Minor places in Middle-earth
 Dolmen
 Stupa

References

Sources 
 
 
 
 
 Grinsell, L.V., 1936, The Ancient Burial-mounds of England. London: Methuen.

External links

 
 English Heritage Monument Class Descriptions
 The Victorian Barrow Diggers of Wales
 Location Tumuli of Grimde Tienen
 Comprehensive Database of Archaeological Site Reports in Japan
 Heritage Quest, research project using LiDAR data

 
Indo-European archaeology
Indo-European religion
Latin words and phrases